The House at Praça Rodrigues Lima, no. 76 is a historic residence in Caetité, Bahia, Brazil. It is located within the Historic Center of Caetité, and is one of many historic houses surrounding the Praça Rodrigues Lima. The square was once home to an 18th-century municipal market, but is now demolished. It is located across the square from the House at Praça Rodrigues Lima, no. 178 and in the middle of a row of houses that include the House at Praça Rodrigues Lima, no. 105. It was listed as a state heritage site by the Institute of Artistic and Cultural Heritage of Bahia in 2008.

Structure

The house has a single floor with a portal at center, four windows to the left, and three to the right. It is in close alignment to the street on a modest slope and sits behind a low fence.

Access

The house is not open to the public and may not be visited.

References

Buildings and structures in Bahia
State heritage sites of Bahia
Houses in Brazil